Ionactis stenomeres, the Rocky Mountain aster, is a rare North American species in the family Asteraceae. It in the Province of British Columbia in western Canada and also in the northwestern United States (Washington, Idaho, Montana).

Description
The plant usually produces only one flower head, each with 7-21 blue or lavender ray flowers surrounding yellow disc flowers.

References

Astereae
Flora of the Northwestern United States
Flora of British Columbia
Plants described in 1882
Flora without expected TNC conservation status